Ploetzia is a genus of butterflies in the family Hesperiidae. It consists of only one species, Ploetzia amygdalis, which is found in northern and north-eastern Madagascar. The habitat consists of forests and anthropogenic environments.

The larvae feed on the leaves of coconut palms of the family Arecaceae.

References

External links 

 Natural History Museum Lepidoptera genus database
  Seitz, A. Die Gross-Schmetterlinge der Erde 13: Die Afrikanischen Tagfalter. Plate XIII 79

Erionotini
Monotypic butterfly genera
Hesperiidae genera
Taxa named by Max Saalmüller